The Thrissur Pooram is an annual Hindu temple festival held in Thrissur, Kerala, India. It is held at the Vadakkunnathan (Shiva) Temple in Thrissur every year on the Pooram (pronounced ) day—the day when the moon rises with the Pooram star in the Malayalam Calendar month of Medam. It is the largest and most famous of all poorams in India.

History

Thrissur Pooram (തൃശ്ശൂര്‍ പൂരം) was the brainchild of Rama Varma Kunhjippilla Thampuran, or Rama Varma IX, famously known as Sakthan Thampuran, the Maharaja of Cochin (1790–1805). Before the start of Thrissur Pooram, the largest temple festival in Kerala was the one-day festival held at Aarattupuzha known as Arattupuzha Pooram. Temples in and around the city of Thrissur were regular participants. In the year 1798 because of incessant rains, the temples from Thrissur were late for the Arattupuzha Pooram and were denied access to the Pooram procession. Feeling embarrassed and angered by the denial, the temple authorities raised the issue with Sakthan Thampuran.

This made him take the decision to unify the 10 temples situated around Vadakkunnathan Temple and organized the celebration of Thrissur Pooram as a mass festival. He invited temples with their deities to the city of Thrissur to pay obeisance to Lord Vadakkunnathan (Lord Siva), the presiding deity of the Vadakkunnathan Temple. Something unique about this festival is that everything used in the festival is made fresh every year from scratch. There are people who are given the duty to craft the umbrellas and the nettipattam.

Participants
Sakthan Thampuran ordained the temples into two groups, namely "Paramekkavu side" and "Thiruvambady side". These are headed by the principal participants, Paramekkavu Bagavathi Temple at Thrissur Swaraj Round and Thiruvambadi Sri Krishna Temple at Shoranur road.

Western Group (Thiruvambady side)
 Thiruvambadi Sri Krishna Temple
 Laloor Bhagavathy Temple 
 Ayyanthole Sree Karthyayani Temple 
 Nethilakkavu Bhagavathy Temple

Eastern Group (Paramekkavu side)
 Paramekkavu Bhagavathy Temple 
 Chembukkavu Bhagavathy Temple
 Panamukkumpally Sastha Temple 
 Choorakkottukavu Bhagavathy Temple
 Pookattikkara - Karamukku Bhagavathy Temple
 Kanimangalam Sastha temple

The Pooram is centered on the Vadakkunnathan Temple, with all these temples sending their processions to pay obeisance to the Shiva, the presiding deity. The Thampuran is believed to have chalked out the program and the main events of the Thrissur Pooram festival.

Flag Hoisting
The pooram officially begins from the event of flag hoisting (കൊടിയേറ്റം).

The flag hosting ceremony (Kodiyettam) begins seven days before Thrissur Pooram. All the participating temples of Thrissur Pooram are present for the ceremony, and there is a light fireworks to announce the commencement of the festival.

Poora Vilambharam
Poora Vilambaram is a custom where the elephant pushes open the south entrance gate of the Vadakkunnathan Temple, which hosts the Thrissur Pooram, with the idol of 'Neithilakkavilamma' atop it.

Display of fireworks (first round)
The first round of pyrotechnics, known as Sample Vedikettu, happens on the fourth day after the flag hoisting of the Pooram. It is a one-hour show presented by Thiruvambady and Paramekkavu Devaswoms. Swaraj Round is venue for this fireworks and starts at 7:15 pm. The display usually has innovative patterns and varieties of fireworks. Even though there were several controversies, permission was granted to conduct Thrissur Pooram in 2017

Display of caparisons
The golden elephant caparison (Nettipattam), elephant accoutrements (Chamayam), ornamental fan made of peacock feathers (Aalavattom), royal fan (Venchamarom), sacred bells and decorative umbrellas are prepared new by Thiruvambady and Paramekkavu Devawsoms separately. Paramekkavu Devaswom exhibits this at the Agrasala in Thrissur City, and the Thiruvambady Devaswom displays the caparisons at the Church Mission Society High School in Thrissur City on the fourth and fifth day before the Pooram. In 2014 and 2015, it was displayed in Kousthubham Hall at Shornur Road

Main pooram
The pooram starts at the time of Kanimangalam sasthavu ezhunnellippu in the early morning and is followed by the ezhunnellippu of other six temples. One of the major events in Thrissur Pooram is "Madathil varavu", a panchavadhyam melam, participating more than 200 artists, with instruments such as thimila, madhalam, trumpet, cymbal and edakka. At 2:00, inside the vadakkumnathan temple starts the Ilanjithara melam is one of the central attractions of the pooram, consisting of drum, trumpets, pipe and cymbal.

The pooram has a good collection of elephants (more than 50) decorated with nettipattam (decorative golden headdress), strikingly crafted Kolam, decorative bells, and ornaments.

At the end of the pooram, after the Ilanjithara melam, both Paramekkavu and Thiruvambadi groups enter the temple through the western gate, come out through the southern gate and array themselves face to face in distant places. The two groups in the presence of melam exchange colourful and crafted umbrellas competitively at the top of the elephants, called Kudamattom, which is the eye-catching attraction of the pooram.

Later all poorams conclude at Nilapaduthara near western gopuram of Vadakkunnathan Temple.

Another notable feature of the pooram is its secular nature. All religious communities actively participate and play prominent roles in the festival. While most of the pandal works are crafted by the Muslim community, materials for the umbrellas for Kudamattom are offered by the churches and their members. This harmonious relationship amongst various religious groups that has been prevalent historically in the region is something Keralites are extremely proud of.

Display of fireworks (main round)
Thrissur pooram main fireworks (vedikettu / വെടിക്കെട്ട് ) are well renowned all over the country. This amazing display of fireworks is held in the heart of Thrissur city, in Thekkinkadu Maidan.

Thiruvambadi and Parmekavu are the main participants in this event. The main fireworks begin in the early morning of the seventh day. Most pooram enthusiasts stay up all night to get a better view of the fireworks. People come from faraway places to watch this amazing display of pyrotechnics. There are four major firework displays in Thrissur Pooram: the 'sample fireworks' on the day before the Pooram, the colorful sparklers that light up the sky (amittu) by both sides on the Pooram evening after the Southward Descent, the most impressive event that mark the peak of Pooram celebrations in the early morning hours, and the final fireworks the following noon after the goddesses bid farewell to each other that mark the end of the pooram.

Farewell ceremony
The seventh day of the pooram is the last day. It is also known as "Pakal Pooram" (പകല് പൂരം). For the people of Thrissur, the pooram is not only a festival but also a time for hospitality. Upacharam Cholli Piriyal (ഉപചാരം ചൊല്ലി പിരിയല്‍) (farewell ceremony) is the last event held at Swaraj Round. Thiruvambadi Sri Krishna Temple and Paramekkavu Bagavathi Temple idols were taken from the Swaraj Round to their respective temples to mark the end of the Pooram celebrations. The festival ends with display of fireworks known as Pakal Vedikkettu.

Cultural influences

Despite being a Hindu festival, the Thrissur Pooram is attended by different sections of Kerala society. Several replicas of the festival are held in places in Kerala as well as outside the state.

Thrissur Pooram is considered one of the greatest gatherings in Asia. It has an important place in the tourism map of India, as tourists enjoy the beauty and traditions of this pooram. Rail  and bus connectivity is excellent in Thrissur, which attracts many foreign tourists to the gala. It is considered as meeting of Devas (ദേവ സംഗമം).

The Oscar-winning sound editor Resul Pookutty and his team recorded the sounds of the 36-hour festivities and made a movie The Sound Story.

References

External links

All Information About Thrissur District
Thrissur Pooram Festival
Thrissur Pooram - Community Media Website
Thrissur - History
Instagram

 
Festivals in Thrissur district
Elephant festivals in Kerala
Hindu festivals in Kerala
March observances
April observances
May observances